Satomi Misumi (born March 7, 1989) is a Japanese pop singer. She also goes under the names Satomi and Satton. In 2003, she began vocal and dance lessons simultaneously. She had her first live performance at 15 at the MIDEM 2005 International Music Conference where she was discovered by a sports magazine. She debuted in the United Kingdom in 2005 with the song "love shouts" under the hiptones label as the label's first featured artist.

On October 24, 2006, Satomi released "Heartbreaker" single in the UK with simultaneous releases in the UK and Japan iTunes stores. The single reached the Top 10 in the R&B and comprehensive charts. She debuted in Japan with the double A-side single "Yesterday/Love to stay" on February 8, 2006. Currently, she is under the Aozora Records Label in Japan.

Discography

Original studio albums
2007-02-07 Diamondlily
2008-03-26 Angelite
2008-10-29 Daisylight (iTunes Digital Releases)
2009-05-20 The Best (Japanese First BEST album)
2010-04-28 Blacrystal (Japanese Special album)

Japanese singles
2006-02-08 Yesterday / Love to stay
2006-08-02 Candy magic
2006-11-08 Orange canvas ~秋の空のしたで~ / Fairy's stick (Aki no Sora no Shita de; Under the Autumn Sky) #81 1,277
2007-07-11 Baby Doll
2007-09-21 Baby Doll -DJ KAZ ambivalence mix- (12-inch Vinyl)
2007-11-21 Darlin'×2 feat. COMA-CHI
2008-03-05 Bright Will

Mini-albums
2007-12-05 SINGS ~Winter, and Luv~

UK singles (as Satomi)
2005-02-14 love shouts
2005-06-20 Toxic Love (Pre-debut Vinyl)
2005-10-24 HEARTBREAKER
2006-02-08 Love to Stay (Limited Edition)
2006-03-13 Oh! (feat. Doc Brown)

Digital Japanese releases
2007-02-07 No. 1
2007-02-07 Time
2007-03-07 Spring
2007-04-11 Crystal Drops -Long Version-
2007-05-30 Time -Lord Finesse & Davel "Bo" McKenzie remix-
2007-10-24 Beautiful Life
2007-12-26 Fly magic boy
2008-01-30 Innumerable answers
2008-02-20 KISS feat. OKI
2008-03-19 Drive feat. SHIZOO -Ready version-
2008-07-02 Darlin'×2 feat. Chris (DJ Kenkaida R&B House Remix) Remixed by DJ Kenkaida
2008-08-20 One Day
2008-08-27 Memory -夏色の宝物- (Natsu-iro no Takaramono; Treasured Summer Colors)
2008-10-01 Show ur love
2008-10-08 Present feat. KEN THE 390
2008-11-26 Joy of Love -SEXY-SYNTHESIZER REMIX-
2009-02-04 Miss U
2009-03-04 Love U
2009-04-01 Precious days -With U-
2009-05-06 All for U
2009-05-06 Love Strings (Miss U, Love U, Precious days -With U-, All for U)

Collaborations and compilations
2008-08-26「EMOTION ～ "J" R&B Greatest Hits」
02. Yesterday
08. Candy
2009-09-16 Kotodama feat. Dohzi-T & SATOMI' / DJ YUTAKA
2009-10-07 ありがとう さよなら feat. SATOMI' (Arigatou Sayonara; Thank you, Goodbye) / CLENCH & BLISTAH
2009-12-23 Time and You (Digital Single) / AILI thanx to SATOMI'

References

External links
Official website

1989 births
Living people
Musicians from Yamaguchi Prefecture
21st-century Japanese singers
21st-century Japanese women singers